The Höttinger Bach is a river of Tyrol, Austria.

In the course of time it created a small ravine called . The overground part is visible until the street .

Near its origin the city erected a drinking water reservoir, which mainly supplies the  region additionally. Its excellent A grade quality is kept by the river in the whole course.

The small river may look like a harmless water but can quickly get flooded due to high water or strong rain. Hötting had to suffer from this already several times.

References

Rivers of Tyrol (state)
Rivers of Austria